José Martín Menacho Aguilera (born August 7, 1973 in Santa Cruz de la Sierra) is a retired Bolivian football striker.

Club career
Nicknamed El Loco, Menacho has developed most of his football career in Liga de Fútbol Profesional Boliviano. His former clubs are Destroyers, Blooming, Oriente Petrolero, Wilstermann, Real Potosí, Bolívar, La Paz, Guabirá and Nacional Potosí. He also had a brief spell with Peruvian club Sport Ancash in 2005.

Among his accomplishments, he finished as the top scorer in the 2004 Apertura tournament with 15 goals.

International career
Menacho has been capped for the Bolivia national team from 1999 to 2001. He represented his country in one FIFA World Cup qualification match and at the 1999 Confederations Cup.

Honours

Club
 Blooming
 Liga de Fútbol Profesional Boliviano: 1998, 1999
 Bolívar
 Liga de Fútbol Profesional Boliviano: 2006 (C)

Individual
 Real Potosí
 Liga de Fútbol Profesional Boliviano Topscorer: 2004-A (15 goals)

References

External links

Apertura 2004

1973 births
Living people
Sportspeople from Santa Cruz de la Sierra
Association football forwards
Bolivian footballers
Bolivia international footballers
1999 FIFA Confederations Cup players
Bolivian Primera División players
Club Destroyers players
Club Blooming players
Oriente Petrolero players
C.D. Jorge Wilstermann players
The Strongest players
Club Real Potosí players
Sport Áncash footballers
Club Bolívar players
La Paz F.C. players
Guabirá players
Nacional Potosí players
Bolivian expatriate footballers
Expatriate footballers in Peru